The At-Bashy is a left tributary of the Naryn in Naryn Region of Kyrgyzstan. The river is formed at the north slope of Jangy-Jer Range by confluence of the rivers Ulan and Jangy-Jer. It flows into the Naryn near Dostuk. Average altitude - 3,060 m, annual average flow rate - 33.1 m³/s, and average specific discharge - 5.98 L/s•km2.
Settlements located along the banks of the At-Bashy include: At-Bashy, Bash-Kayyngdy, Birinchi May and Taldy-Suu.

References 

Rivers of Kyrgyzstan